The 1935 Auburn Tigers football team represented Auburn University in the 1935 college football season. The Tigers' were led by head coach Jack Meagher in his second season and finished the season with a record of eight wins and two losses (8–2 overall, 5–2 in the SEC).

Schedule

Source: 1935 Auburn football schedule

References

Auburn
Auburn Tigers football seasons
Auburn Tigers football